The following is a list of the awards and nominations received by Charlotte Rampling.

Major associations

Academy Awards

Berlin International Film Festival

César Awards

Emmy Awards

European Film Awards

Golden Globe Awards

Screen Actors Guild Award

Venice Film Festival

Other awards and nominations

AACTA Awards

Alliance of Women Film Journalists

Boston Society of Film Critics Awards

British Independent Film Awards

Chicago Film Critics Association

Cinemanila International Film Festival

Critics' Choice Movie Awards

Dallas-Fort Worth Film Critics Association

Edinburgh International Film Festival

Evening Standard Film Awards

Fantasporto

Florida Film Critics Circle

Indiana Film Journalists

Indiewire

Locarno Festival

London Film Critics' Circle

Los Angeles Film Critics Association

National Society of Film Critics

Online Film Critics Society Award

San Diego Film Critics Society Awards

San Francisco Film Critics Circle Awards

Satellite Awards

Stockholm International Film Festival

Telluride Film Festival

Valladolid Film Festival

See also 
 Charlotte Rampling filmography

References 

Lists of awards received by British actor
Lists of awards received by British musician